Fred Burchell may refer to:
Fred Burchell (baseball), MLB player
Fred Burchell (ice hockey), NHL player